The Saptha Kannimar Padal is one of the sub-sections of Arul Nool which was the secondary scripture of Ayyavazhi. This follows the concept of Saptha Kanya.The author of the content is unknown. This contains the event's background and reason for the birth of the seven virgins in the world. Below are the names of Saptha Kannimar:
Brameshwari
Kaumari
Varahi
Vaishnavi
Chamundi
Maheshwari
Indrani

Kannimar Temples in Tamil Nadu

Sri Kannimar thirukkovil is located in Issukazhi katteri, (near Thandarai), Tiruvannamalai. Saptha Kannigal Brahmi, Maheshwari, Kowmaari, Vaishnavi, Indraani, Varaahi and Chaamundi are the deities of this Village, and it is believed that they protect their families and village from diseases, floods, drought and other calamities. They bring prosperity to the people.
Saptha kanniyar sannidhi is separately devoted and built with artistic nuances with natural sceneries and animals pictures painted on the surrounding walls. The terrace is left open unto the sky. This sannidhi is located in Melmaruvathur Aadhiparasakthi Sidhar Peedam, Melmaruvathur. 

Sri Kannimar Thiru Kovil is located in Sakkayanayakkanur village which is located on the Sembatti Road which leads to Palani. GPS Coordinate of the Temple (10.233697,77.892362)
The Saptha Kannimar temple is located in Sethumadai village, which is located 25 km from Pollachi Town in Coimbatore District.
Saptha Kannimar ancient temple located at kadathur village, Kallakkurichi t.k, Villuppuram, Tamil Nadu
Saptha Kanniyar temple also located at Uththamar koil near Tiruchirapalli in Tamil Nadu. 
Kannimar Temple located at Tiruchengode Town was built about 200 years ago by the farmers around the temple.
Kannimar temple located at Thiruvallur (dist), Thomur (vill) via Kanakkammachathiram was built in ancient days.
Chennai: Kannimar temple located at Saiva Muthiah 6th Street, Royapettah, Chennai.
Chennai (Velachery): Saptha Kanniyar is also present in Velachery-Baby Nagar-(Gandhi Road - Seethapathy Nagar.) Thiru vedhi Amman temple.
 Saptha Kanni (Chelliamman)in Dandeeswaram.  Heard from locals, it's 300 years old. Opposite Siva temple pond, Velachery. Chennai.
Kannimar Temple located at Vellor district, 2 km inside Ponnai Village, S. N. Palayam: Temple built in the year 2009
Kannimar Temple located in Padalam near Chengalpattu.
Another one is in Manapakkam, also near Chengalpattu.
Saptha Kannimar Temple is located near Sullerumbu Village (Vedasandur to Oddanchatram Road). It is a Kula deivam temple for Soppiyavar Kulam of 24 manai Telugu Chettiar Community
Kannimar Temple is located in Elachipalayam, Karumathampatti, Coimbatore.
Saptha Kannimar temple is located in dharapuram in nattukalpalayam village. It is a Kula deivam temple for pasupulluvaru kulam of Telugu devanga chettiar community. It is a powerful god for the particular kulam community peoples.
An ancient kannimar temple is located near kodumudi. The temple is located at vattakkal valasu near karmandam palayam. this place comes between erode and kodumudi. The temple is an ancient temple and is located on the banks of river Cauvery. The temple is surrounded by evergreen agricultural land. And in the temple, there is a terra cotta statue of the goddesses, which is believed 200plus year old. And it is Kula theivam for Murugan Kothiram, Solamudali Kothiram,
An Kannimar Temple is located in Thottipalayam Village, Near Elumathur in Erode district where all Shaptha Kanni are having individual statues. A very peaceful place.

Kannimar Kothiram of Sengunthar  Kaikola Mudaliar community and other Devotees from all over Tamil Nadu frequently visit this temple. Every new moon day there is a grand pooja which is witnessed by a large group of devotees from all over Tamil Nadu. And it is a must visit for all Kannimar devotees.
saptha kannigal in kovilur@ thanjavur district
Saptha Kannigal temple located in Kovilur which is between Punnainallur Mariamman temple and Poondi in Thanjavur district which is believed to be 1000+ years old temple. Chola Kingdom worshiped the god before going to war. This saptha kannigal are one of the parivara devathaigal of kathayee amman is moolavar in the temple. Every pournami homam is conducted here
Sri sapthakannimaar amman in Palavanatham
Temple located near Salem-->Vembadithalam--->Venpalayam worshipped as Kula devivam for Anthelaaru Devanga chettiar.
Kannimar temple nilakkottai taluk, sekkapatty village, jampu odai bank of vaikai river, this temple kulipatti gavaras kuladeivam.
Saptha Kannimar temple is located in Elangaadu village near Thirukkattupalli in Thanjavur district.  It is a Kula deivam for Sozhiya Vellalar Community
Saptha kanniyar temple is located at Kunnaththur, Vellore district. Kula theivam for Sengunthar Kaikola Mudaliyars.(Echchaana Kothiram). Here goddesses are worshipped by regular poojas and special poojas in the month of Aadi and Thai.
Saptha kannimar temple is located in sembiyanmadevi. kallakurichi district (salem-chennai bye pass road).
Saptha kannimar is located in Sendurai, nNatham Tk. DIndigul District.
Saptha kannimar temple is located in ayyampettai. Tanjavur district 

Arulmigu Kannimar Samy is worshiped by Sengunthar and jangam community. They have a unique way of worship. They boil rice in seven pots placed one on top of other. Kannimar is represented as locas, sapta swaram and seven energy centres in the human body.

Ayyavazhi texts

External links
1.https://en.m.wikipedia.org/wiki/Ankalamma
2.https://en.wikipedia.org/wiki/Matrikas